Higashino Station may refer to:
 Higashino Station (Kyoto) on the Tozai Line of Kyoto Municipal Subway
 Higashino Station (Gifu) on the Akechi Railway